Bob Fosse was a dancer, choreographer, theatre and film director.

He directed and choreographed musical works on stage and screen, including the stage musicals The Pajama Game (1954), Damn Yankees (1955), How to Succeed in Business Without Really Trying (1961), Sweet Charity (1966), Pippin (1972), and Chicago (1975). His films include Sweet Charity (1969), Cabaret (1972), Lenny (1975), All That Jazz (1979), and Star 80 (1983).

Fosse's distinctive style of choreography included turned-in knees and "jazz hands". He is the only person ever to have won Oscar, Emmy, and Tony awards in the same year (1973). He was nominated for four Academy Awards, winning Best Director for Cabaret (1972) and won the Palme D'Or in 1980 for All That Jazz. He won a record eight Tonys for his choreography for The Pajama Game, Damn Yankees, Redhead, Little Me, Sweet Charity, Pippin, Dancin''', and Big Deal, as well as one for direction for Pippin''.

Major associations

Academy Award

Tony Award

Primetime Emmy Award

Golden Globe Award

British Academy Film Award

Industry awards

Drama Desk Award

Cannes Film Festival

Directors Guild of America

References 

Lists of awards received by American musician